Larry Blair may refer to:

Larry Blair (basketball) player in 2006–07 NCAA Division I men's basketball season
Larry Blair (surfer) in Billabong Pipeline Masters
Larry Blair (businessman), co-founder of Kalpana

See also
Lawrence Blair (born 1942), British anthropologist, author, explorer and filmmaker
Lawrence Blair (bishop) (1868–1925), English bishop